Pavonini is a tribe of bird in the subfamily Phasianinae. Members of this family are primarily found in tropical Asia, along with one species in the Congo Rainforest in Africa. It contains two of the most charismatic members of the Phasianidae, the peafowl and the arguses. This grouping was supported by a 2021 phylogenetic analysis of Galliformes, and accepted by the International Ornithological Congress. The tribe name is accepted by the Howard and Moore Complete Checklist of the Birds of the World.

Species

References 

Bird tribes
Pavonini
Taxa named by Constantine Samuel Rafinesque